Egypt Today is an Egyptian English-language monthly news magazine owned by Egyptian Media Group.

History and profile
Egypt Today was first published in 1979. It covers Egyptian current affairs and some international news. The magazine is published by IBA media, which also publishes Business Today Egypt, another monthly magazine. Both magazines are based in Cairo.

In March 2005, the magazine was banned in the country due to its article on the 2005 presidential election. The 2013 circulation of the magazine was about 14,500 copies.

See also
 List of magazines in Egypt

References

External links
 Official website

1979 establishments in Egypt
Censorship in Egypt
English-language magazines
Magazines established in 1979
Magazines published in Cairo
Monthly magazines published in Egypt
News magazines published in Africa
Banned magazines